The University of Colorado Museum of Natural History is a museum of natural history in Boulder, Colorado.  With more than four million artifacts and specimens in the areas of anthropology, botany, entomology, paleontology and zoology, the museum houses one of the most extensive and respected natural history collections in the Rocky Mountain and Plains regions, making it one of the top university natural science museums in the country.  In 2003, the University of Colorado Museum received accreditation by the American Alliance of Museums.

The museum was founded in 1902, when Judge Junius Henderson was appointed its first curator. The University of Colorado Museum is housed on the University of Colorado Boulder campus in the Henderson Building. The museum is open daily from 9:00 a.m. to 5:00 p.m., except Saturday from 9:00 a.m. to 4:00 p.m. and Sunday from 10:00 a.m. to 4:00 p.m.

References

Museum of Natural history
Institutions accredited by the American Alliance of Museums
University museums in Colorado
Museums in Boulder, Colorado
Natural history museums in Colorado
Paleontology in Colorado